The Lifeboat College is the national training centre of the RNLI in Poole, Dorset, England.

History
The RNLI has around 4,600 crew members. The RNLI receives no government financial assistance.

Construction
The turf was cut in January 2003. It was built by Dean and Dyball of Hampshire. It was opened by the Queen on 28 July 2004.

Structure
It is situated slightly north of, and next-door to, the famous speedboat manufacturer Sunseeker on the west side of Holes Bay, off the A350. Directly to the north is the large Asda Poole. On the opposite side of the road is the RNLI Support Centre. Also nearby is the RNLI All-Weather Lifeboat Centre (ALC) which opened in August 2015.

It is a residential college and has sixty bedrooms. It has an annual cost of around £1.1 million. It aimed to train around 4,000 people a year, although around 1,500 are currently trained each year. It often hosts exhibitions and conferences with organisations unconnected to the RNLI, such as trade exhibitions. It has a 120-seat auditorium.

A lifeboat simulator, with a five-metre-radius cylindrical visualisation screen with Digital Light Processing (DLP), was provided by Antycip Simulation UK of Oxfordshire.

Training
It has a Sea Survival Centre with a 25 m × 12.5 m × 4 m deep wave pool.

Visits
On 5 February 2014, CBBC series 2 episode 3 of Absolute Genius with Dick and Dom visited the college, with instructor Matt Cridland. It was filmed on 24 September 2013.

See also
 Maritime Rescue Institute, in Scotland
 RM Poole, home of the Special Boat Service (SBS)

References

External links
 

2004 establishments in England
Buildings and structures completed in 2004
Buildings and structures in Poole
Economy of Dorset
Education in Poole
Educational institutions established in 2004
Exhibition and conference centres in England
Further education colleges in Dorset
Royal National Lifeboat Institution
Survival training